"Bet'cha Gonna Need My Lovin'" is a song by American singer La Toya Jackson and the first single from the 1984 album Heart Don't Lie. It  was released on 7" and 12" singles without a B-side track, and peaked at No. 25 on the Billboard Hot R&B/Hip-Hop Singles & Tracks chart and at No. 55 on the Billboard Hot Dance Music/Club Play chart. Jackson performed "Bet'cha Gonna Need My Lovin'" on the June 30, 1984 episode of "Bandstand".

Versions
 Album version – 4:28
 Instrumental version – 5:10
 Single version – 3:37
 Vocal Mix
 Special Radio Mix
 Special Radio Mix - Instrumental

References

La Toya Jackson songs
1983 singles
1983 songs
Epic Records singles
Songs written by Amir Bayyan